The western forest robin (Stiphrornis erythrothorax erythrothorax) is a subspecies of the forest robin found at low levels in West African forests from Sierra Leone to Nigeria. It has been placed in the family Turdidae, but is now generally placed in Muscicapidae. It commonly includes the other members in the genus Stiphrornis as subspecies, in which case the common name for the "combined species" simply is forest robin. The western forest robin can be separate from the other members of the genus by the combination of its deep orange throat and breast, white belly, and olive upperparts. It also appears to differ vocally from the other members in the genus, but a comprehensive study on this is lacking. When considered conspecific with the other members from its genus, S. erythrothorax is considered to be of least concern by IUCN. While not rated following the split into several species, it has been described as frequent to locally abundant, and is therefore unlikely to qualify for a threatened category.

Taxonomy
The initial split into multiple species within this genus is based on a review from 1999 where it, based on the phylogenetic species concept, was argued that all then recognized taxa should be considered monotypic species. Of these, S. gabonensis and S. xanthogaster were formerly considered subspecies of S. erythrothorax, whereas S. saghensis was described as an entirely new species. The split was not followed in Handbook of the Birds of the World, where it was described as "perhaps premature". Comparably, the BirdLife Taxonomic Working Group (and consequently IUCN) recommended not following the split, as differences in plumages are relatively small, genetic sampling considered incomplete, and evidence for intergradation or parapatry is lacking. Another species from this complex, S. pyrrholaemus, was described as a new species in 2008. Based on mtDNA, it is placed within S. erythrothorax sensu lato, and consequently is only a species (rather than a subspecies of S. erythrothorax) if at least some of the taxonomy recommended in 1999 is followed. The genetic divergence between S. pyrrholaemus and other members of the genus is comparable to that between some other closely related species.

References

Stiphrornis